According to Pew Research, Nigeria is the second most religious country in the world. Its populace is evenly divided between the largely Muslim north and the predominantly Christian south.

Below is a list of notable churches in Nigeria. It also contains the year of establishment, founder and the current general overseer of the congregation.

See also
 List of notable pastors in Nigeria

References

Churches in Nigeria
Churches
Nigeria